Framura is a comune (municipality) in the Province of La Spezia in the Italian region Liguria, located about  southeast of Genoa and about  northwest of La Spezia.

The municipality of Framura contains the frazioni (subdivisions, mainly villages and hamlets) Anzo, Ravecca, Setta, Costa, and Castagnola.

Framura borders the following municipalities: Bonassola, Carrodano, Deiva Marina, Levanto.

History
During World War II, American 15-men missions called Operations Ginny I and II tried to land and blow up a railway tunnel between Framura and Bonassola. Both missions failed but the second mission's soldiers were executed and buried in a mass grave by the German Army.

Demographic evolution

References

Cities and towns in Liguria